Eugen Botez is a Romanian sprint canoer who competed in the early 1970s. He won two silver medals in the K-1 4 x 500 m event at the ICF Canoe Sprint World Championships, earning them in  1970 and 1971.

References

Living people
Romanian male canoeists
Year of birth missing (living people)
ICF Canoe Sprint World Championships medalists in kayak